Lightsey is a surname. Notable people with the surname include:

 Harry Lightsey (1901–1986), American college football player and coach, politician, and judge
 Hugh T. Lightsey (1925−2019), American politician 
 Kirk Lightsey (born 1937), American jazz pianist